Aside from a mutual belief in the Old Testament, Judaism and Rastafari closely align in essence, tradition, and heritage, as both are Abrahamic religions. However, the philosophy behind many customs is what truly differentiates the two religions. There are stark differences in some core beliefs in regards to the messianic prophecies, apprehensions behind traditions, and even dietary restrictions. However, they are more similar rather than different on a vast spectrum of ideas, values and ethics.

Messianic prophecies 
A primary comparison to make between Rastafari and Judaism is that both religions believe that there will be a coming of the Messiah, although they do not agree on who that Messiah is or will be. In the Jewish religion "The Messiah will indeed be a king from the house of David who will gather the scattered of Israel together, but the order of the world will not be radically changed by his coming."

This is in contrast to Nyabinghi and Bobo Ashanti belief, in which they believe Jesus, in the form of Haile Selassie, the emperor of Ethiopia from 1930–1974, is their Messiah; and the Twelve Tribes of Israel, who believe that Selassie was simply a divinely-appointed monarch and Jesus himself is the Messiah (or Messiyah). Many Rastafari believe Haile Selassie's lineage can be traced back to King Solomon and the Queen of Sheba, and is thusly known as the Solomonic dynasty. The perspective on the coming of the Messiah in Judaism are akin to that of Rastafari in that, "The Messiah will indeed be a king from the house of David who will gather the scattered of Israel together, but the order of the world will not be radically changed by his coming." In addition to the belief that all Jewish people across the globe will become docile to the teachings of the Torah, is the prophecy of world peace and order.

The root of the Rastafari Messianic belief came from Marcus Garvey's prophecy in which he states "Look to Africa where a black king shall be crowned, he shall be the Redeemer." The rise of Halie Selassie's reign came promptly after Marcus Garvey's remarks, validating his prophecy and granting Selassie with the divine title of "God of the Black race" among some Rastafari.

Jewish vs. Rastafari laws 
Since both Rastafari and Jews use the Old Testament as their holy scripture, they both follow more or less the same principles, ideals, values and ethics as one another. However, interpretations of laws in the Old Testament varies between the two groups. An example of a law both Rastafari and Jews follow would be the restriction of any alterations to the hair. It is said in Leviticus 19:27: "Ye shall not round the corners of your heads, neither shalt thou mar the corners of thy beard", in Leviticus 21:5: "They shall not make any baldness upon their head, neither shall they shave off the corner of their beard, nor make any cuttings in the flesh" and in Numbers 6:5, "All the days of the vow of his separation there shall no razor come upon his head: until the days be fulfilled, in the which he spareth himself unto the Lord, he shall be holy, and shall let the locks of the hair of his head grow." This explains the long sideburns and beards of religious Jews as well as the dreadlocks associated with observant Rastafari.

References

Judaism and other religions
Rastafari